Mighty Trains (also known as Megatrains on Discovery Channel Australia) is a documentary television program, part of the "Mighty" franchise, alongside Mighty Planes, Mighty Cruise Ships and Mighty Ships. The series was produced in Canada and aired on Discovery Channel Canada. Smithsonian Channel had an executive production role in Season 1. Each episode of the series follows a particular train.

Episodes

Season 1 (2016)

Season 2 (2018)

Season 3 (2019)

Season 4

References

External links

See also
 Mighty Ships
 Mighty Planes

2016 Canadian television series debuts
2010s Canadian reality television series
2010s Canadian documentary television series
Discovery Channel (Canada) original programming